Bigg Boss Marathi 4 is the fourth season of Marathi version of the reality television show Bigg Boss broadcast in India. The grand premiere was held on 2 October 2022 on Colors Marathi and Voot with Mahesh Manjrekar.

Production

Teaser 
On 24 July 2022, the makers had officially launched the season 4 promo on Colors Marathi. After few days Mahesh Manjrekar confirmed his return to host this show.

Eye logo
The border of the eye is golden with a dark pink background. In middle, there is rangoli type design & has name BB.

Concept
The theme and concept of this season is All is well which means that "hope" that everything will be fine and no unwell things will happen in the house.

House
The House of this season had a "Chawl" theme. The House was located in Goregaon for the 3rd time. For the first time in the history of Bigg Boss Marathi the season had Balcony which is represent 75 years of Independence.

Development
The press conference and launch event for this season was held on 26 September 2022, anchored by former contestant Vikas Patil.

Broadcast 
Apart from the usual hour-long episode, viewers also has access to the direct 24x7 camera footage. The
viewers also has access to Before TV on Voot Select where the episode will telecast 30 minutes before it will telecast on Colors Marathi. On weekdays, the show will at 10.00 PM IST & weekend show which is named as Bigg Boss Chi Chavadi will at 9.30 PM IST.

Housemates status

Housemates
The list of contestants in the order of entering the house

Original entrants
 Tejaswini Lonari - Film and television actress. Known for playing roles in film Guldasta, Chinu, Doghat Tisra Aata Sagla Visra. She was played a lead role of Rani Padmini in Chittod Ki Rani Padmini Ka Johur. She also played a role in Zee Marathi's Devmanus 2.
 Prasad Jawade - Television actor. He started his career from Maharashtracha Superstar as a contestant. He is known for playing a lead role in Zee Marathi's serials such as Arundhati, Vahinisaheb & Ase He Kanyadan.
 Nikhil Rajeshirke - Television actor. Known for playing supporting roles in TV series such as Mazhi Tuzhi Reshimgath, Ajunahi Barsaat Aahe & Rang Maza Vegla.
 Amruta Dhongade - Television actress. Known for playing a lead role in Zee Marathi's Mrs. Mukhyamantri. She made her debut in film with Mithun. She also played lead role in Tu Chandane Shimpit Jashi. 
 Kiran Mane - Television actor. Known for playing the role in Mazhya Navryachi Bayko & Mulgi Zali Ho. He performed in many plays such as Shree Tashi Sau, Perfect Mismatch, Govind Ghya Gopal Ghya and Jhund, etc. He also did small roles in Marathi films. 
 Samruddhi Jadhav - Reality television actress, participated in MTV Splitsvilla.
 Akshay Kelkar - Television actor. He known for playing a lead role in Colors TV's Nima Denzongpa, Sony SAB's Bhakharwadi & also played roles in serials such as Yek Number, Don Cutting.
 Apurva Nemlekar – Television actress. She made her debut with Zee Marathi's Aabhas Ha. She known for her portrayal in Zee Marathi's Ratris Khel Chale 2 & Ratris Khel Chale 3.
 Yogesh Jadhav - Fighter. He rose to fame after his appearance in MTV Roadies X4.
 Amruta Deshmukh - Television actress. She known for her role in Freshers. She made her debut with Star Pravah's Tumcha Aamcha Same Asta. She also played a lead role in Sony Marathi's Mi Tujhich Re. 
 Yashashri Masurkar - Television actress. She is best known for her role in Hindi TV series Rang Badalti Odhani. She also played a role in the serial Chakravartin Ashoka Samrat. She did episodic roles in Savdhaan India & Crime Patrol.
 Vikas Sawant - Choreographer. He choreographed many Bollywood actors such as Ranveer Singh, Salman Khan, Sonakshi Sinha, etc. Before choreographer he was the joker in EsselWorld.
 Megha Ghadge - Film actress and dancer. She made her debut with Maherchi Maya. She known for her portrayal in Pachhadlela. She is also known for her Lavani. 
 Trishul Marathe - Social influencer and struggling actor. He is the first commoner in Bigg Boss Marathi.
 Ruchira Jadhav - Television actress. Mainly acted in Zee Marathi's Majhe Pati Saubhagyawati & Mazhya Navryachi Bayko. She also did a lead role in Haemolymph: Invisible Blood as Sajida Shaikh. 
 Rohit Shinde - Model and doctor. He was Mr. India & MOTG International. He is boyfriend of Ruchira Jadhav.

Wild card entrants
 Snehlata Vasaikar - Television actress. She is known for playing the character of Soyarabai in Swarajyarakshak Sambhaji. She was also a contestant in Fu Bai Fu. She also did a role of Gautamabai in Punyashlok Ahilyabai.

Challengers
 Aroh Welankar - Actor. Known for films like Rege & Ghanta. He was a finalist on Bigg Boss Marathi (season 2) where he finished in 6th position.
 Rakhi Sawant - Actress and dancer. She was a contestant on Bigg Boss (Hindi season 1) where she was evicted on Day 84 in 4th place, Bigg Boss (Hindi season 14) where she was a finalist finishing as 4th Runner-Up and Bigg Boss (Hindi season 15) where she was evicted on Day 117 in 7th place.

Guests
 Mira Jagannath - Television actress. Known for playing the role of Momo in Yeu Kashi Tashi Me Nandayla and supporting role in Mazhya Navryachi Bayko. She was a contestant on Bigg Boss Marathi (season 3) where she was evicted on Day 95, in 6th place. 
 Vishal Nikam - Television actor and model. Known for playing lead role in Dakkhancha Raja Jotiba and Sata Jalmachya Gathi. Currently, he was seen in Jay Bhawani Jay Shivaji as Shiva Kashid. He was the winner of Bigg Boss Marathi (season 3).

Twists

Duties 
On Launch Day before housemates entering the house. They were given options to choose their duties. Bigg Boss made four teams of duties & according to the duties they provided bands to the contestant.

Weekly summary

Guest appearances

Nomination Table 

  indicates the House Captain.
  indicates the Nominees for house captaincy.
  indicates that the Housemate was directly nominated for eviction prior to the regular nominations process.
 indicates that the housemate went to secret room.
  indicates that the Housemate was granted immunity from nominations.
  indicates the winner.
  indicates the first runner up.
  indicates the second runner up.
  indicates the third runner up.
  indicates the fourth runner up.
  indicates the contestant has been walked out of the show.
  indicates the contestant has been evicted.

Notes

 : After being chosen as the "useless" housemates, only Megha, Prasad, Rohit and Trishul could nominate other housemates and were also granted immunity.
 : During Week 2 nominations, Bigg Boss had arranged two train sections, green and red on the board. In green section, the contestants had to put the names of contestants they wanted to save and in the red section, the contestants had to put the names of contestants they wanted to nominate.
 : During Week 3 nominations, Bigg Boss assigned one housemate to each housemate and they had to decide if they want to nominate the housemate assigned to them.
:During Week 4 nominations, Bigg Boss divided the housemates into 6 teams. Each team had to nominate two other teams. The teams were: Kiran & Amruta De, Yogesh & Prasad, Samruddhi & Yashashri, Trishul & Vikas, Ruchira & Amruta Dh, Rohit, Tejaswini & Akshay. House-Captain, Apurva nominated two teams.
: Snehlata was immuned as she entered as a Wild-Card on Day 28.
: During Week 5 nominations, Bigg Boss divided the housemates into 2 teams. Each team had to race to get either safety potions or nomination potions. If the get safety potion, they get to safe a housemate from the other team. If they get nomination potion, they get to nominate a housemate from the other team.
: During Week 6 nominations, Bigg Boss divided the housemates into 2 teams. In each round, 2 teams competed, they winning team mutually get to nominate a housemate from the other team.
: During Week 7 nominations, Bigg Boss calls 2 housemates. Other housemates will race to enter the box, the first five to enter are eligible to judge and mutually decide to nominate 1 of the 2 housemates called by Bigg Boss.
: On Day 49, Kiran was fake evicted from the house and entered the secret  room.
: After Week 8 nominations, Kiran had a special power to directly nominate one housemate.
: Only the 4 challengers got to directly nominate a housemate each.
: On Day 58, Tejaswini left due to her injury.
: On Day 63, Vishal and Mira were revealed as Guest housemates and left the BB house.
: Only the Captain Akshay got to nominate 5 housemates.
: For Week 11 nominations, Bigg Boss divided the housemates into 3 teams. Each housemate had to nominate 1 housemate from 2 other teams.
: Bigg Boss nominated Rakhi for Week 12 as a punishment.

References

External links
 Bigg Boss Marathi 4 at Voot

2022 Indian television seasons
04
Marathi-language television shows
Colors Marathi original programming